Andrew James Constance (born 31 October 1973) is a former Australian politician and was a member of the New South Wales Legislative Assembly representing Bega for the Liberal Party between 2003 and December 2021.

Constance served as the New South Wales Minister for Transport and Roads in the second Berejiklian ministry from April 2019 until October 2021. Previously, he served as the Minister for Transport and Infrastructure from 2 April 2015 until 23 March 2019 in the second Baird and first Berejiklian governments; as the Treasurer of New South Wales and the Minister for Industrial Relations between 2014 and 2015 in the first Baird government; as the Minister for Ageing and Disability Services between 2011 and 2013; and as the Minister for Finance and Services, between 2013 and 2014, in the O'Farrell government.

Political career
At the time Constance was elected in 2003, he was aged 29 years, and he became the youngest member of the Parliament. Constance previously worked as a corporate affairs consultant representing large industry associations and multinationals in the Asia-Pacific region. A former President of the Young Liberals, his family connections in the Bega area stem back to the 1860s when his great-great-grandfather, James Constance, drove a team of bullocks through the Bega Valley.

Constance was appointed Minister for Ageing and Disability Services in 2011 and championed the person-centred reforms which were necessary steps towards the National Disability Insurance Scheme (NDIS). Under Constance's stewardship, NSW became the first Australian state or territory to agree to the full funding of the scheme with the Commonwealth.

Constance was promoted to Minister for Finance and Services in 2013 after the sacking of Greg Pearce, with the portfolio of Ageing and Disability Services transferred to John Ajaka.

Due to the resignation of Barry O'Farrell as Premier, and the subsequent ministerial reshuffle by Mike Baird, the former Treasurer and new Liberal Leader, in April 2014 Constance was appointed as Treasurer; and his responsibilities expanded to include Industrial Relations less than one month later. Constance handed down his first Budget on 17 June 2014.

Following the 2015 state election, Constance was appointed Minister for Transport and Infrastructure. During Constance's tenure as minister, NSW was the first Australian state to legalise ridesharing companies including Uber. He is also responsible for the Sydney Metro. Following the 2019 state election, Constance was sworn in as the Minister for Transport and Roads in the second Berejiklian ministry, with effect from 2 April 2019.

On 10 March 2020, Constance announced his resignation from politics and will not contest the next state election, citing that recovery from the bushfires will take priority before announcing an effective date.

On 5 May 2020, he announced that he would resign from the NSW Cabinet and seek Liberal Party preselection for the 2020 Eden-Monaro by-election. However, within 24 hours he reversed what he called "a hasty decision".  On 8 May, Constance was removed from his role as Leader of the House of the New South Wales Legislative Assembly "as punishment for his spectacular change of heart over quitting state politics".

On 3 October 2021, he announced his intention to quit his state seat to seek Liberal Party preselection for the federal seat of Gilmore at the 2022 federal election
 He announced he would resign on 26 November 2021, triggering a by-election for the seat of Bega. However, he did not officially resign until 30 December 2021. Constance was preselected as the Liberal candidate for Gilmore on 17 January 2022. At the subsequent election, Constance was narrowly defeated by incumbent MP Fiona Phillips of the Australian Labor Party.

See also

O'Farrell ministry
First Baird ministry
Second Baird ministry
First Berejiklian ministry
Second Berejiklian ministry

References

 

 

 

 

 

 

|-
 

1973 births
Members of the New South Wales Legislative Assembly
Liberal Party of Australia members of the Parliament of New South Wales
Living people
People educated at Canberra Grammar School
Treasurers of New South Wales
21st-century Australian politicians